The 2011 Judo Grand Slam Paris was held in Paris, France, from 5 to 6 February 2011.

Medal summary

Men's events

Women's events

Source Results

Medal table

References

External links
 

2011 IJF World Tour
2011 Judo Grand Slam
Judo
Grand Slam Paris 2011
Judo
Judo